Pavel Ilyinsky (Russian name: Павел Ильинский; born 25 June 1944) is a Soviet rower from Russia.

Ilyinsky was born in Leningrad, Soviet Union. At the 1966 World Rowing Championships in Bled, he won silver with the men's eight. He competed at the 1968 Summer Olympics in Mexico City with the men's coxless four where they came eleventh. Ilyinsky later became a rowing coach in his home city.

References

1944 births
Living people
Soviet male rowers
Olympic rowers of the Soviet Union
Rowers at the 1968 Summer Olympics
Rowers from Saint Petersburg
World Rowing Championships medalists for the Soviet Union